Melissa Hernández Pacheco (born 4 February 1980) is a Puerto Rican professional boxer. She held the WBC female featherweight title from 2012 to 2013 and challenged once for the WBC female lightweight title in 2011.

Amateur career
She took up boxing to lose weight when she tipped the scales at 160 pounds (73 kg, 11 stone 6 lbs). She was invited to a gym by her best friend's brother, a two-time Golden Gloves champion. Melissa trained at the gym for a while, but dropped out. However, two months later she walked into a Webster PAL gym, where she decided to take another shot at boxing training.

By the time the 2003 New York Golden Gloves came around, Melissa had reduced her weight to 145 pounds (66 kg, 10 stone 5 lbs), and she signed up to fight at 138 pounds (63 kg, 9 stone 12 lbs). In her first amateur fight, she faced Golden Glove champion Jill Emery and lost.

She then met former world champion Ada Vélez, who invited Belinda Laracuente to watch Melissa fight at the 2003 Women's U.S. Championships in Fort Lauderdale, Florida. Not long after that, Velez and Laracuente moved Melissa from New York City to Florida to train with them. She says of that time:"I lived with them for a while and learned how to box and not just fight. It seemed that a little of the 'Brown Sugar' rubbed off on me and I began to have a little of her style in me. I stayed with Belinda as my head trainer for almost a year, fighting any fights I could get. By the time the 2004 Golden Gloves rolled around I had changed my style to a mix between boxer-brawler. My trainer Pablo knew I had a better shot and I had dropped my weight down to 130 lbs. With hard training and dedication I went on to win the 2004 Golden Gloves."

At the 2004 National PAL Boxing Championships in Virginia Beach, Virginia,  Melissa won the 132-lb division. She also won the 2005 Golden Gloves. She then went on to win the 2005 Florida PAL Championship over Lena Taylor.

Professional career 
Melissa made her pro boxing debut at the Hilton in New York City on October 26, 2005, notching a four-round majority decision over previously unbeaten Mao Mao Zhang of China, also a former amateur champion. Hernández dictated the pace of the fight with her jab. She executed her game plan well by using excellent footwork, head and body movement, as well as feinting, but she did manage to walk into the line of fire a few times and was hit with a couple of solid left hooks as she tried to get inside. Overall, her boxing skills were too much for Zhang, whose pro record fell to 1-1 with the loss.

On January 21, 2006 at the White Rock Boxing Gym in Columbia, South Carolina, Melissa stopped Jennifer Johnson of Camden, South Carolina at 0:17 in the first round, dropping Johnson to 0-2.

On April 29, 2006 at the Silver Reef Casino in Ferndale, Washington, Melissa scored a four round unanimous (40-36 x 3) decision over 19-year-old pro debuter Merced Nunez of Philomoth, Oregon. The difference in this bout was experience. Hernández, though she only has two professional fights, had sixteen amateur bouts. Nunez had only two amateur bouts. Nonetheless, the fight was action packed. Though Nunez stood taller, she had some trouble making contact with the elusive Hernández.
  
On June 15, 2006 at the Seven Feathers Hotel and Casino in Canyonville, Oregon, Melissa faced veteran Kelsey Jeffries over 10 rounds for the IFBA Featherweight title, fighting her to a split draw (95-93 Jeffries, 96-94 Hernández, 95-95). Jeffries was now 33-9-1 (2 KO's) while Hernández was just 3-0-1 (1 KO) as a pro. This was an impressive step-up in competition for Hernández.

On June 30, 2006 at Club Europe in Atlanta, Georgia, Melissa won a six-round unanimous (60-54 x 3) decision over Leora Jackson of Springdale, Arkansas who fell to 2-8. On August 31, 2006 at Harvey's Lake Tahoe in Stateline, Nevada, Melissa TKO'd pro debuter Stacey Rogers of New London, Ohio at 0:42 in the third round of a scheduled four rounder.

World title 
On November 4, 2006 at the Shaw Conference Centre in Edmonton, Alberta, Melissa (119 lbs) won a ten-round unanimous (96-94, 96-94, 98-92) decision over Lisa Brown (121 lbs) of Scarborough, Ontario, Canada to win the WIBA Super Bantamweight World Title. Lisa fell to 12-3-3 (4 KOs) with the loss, while Hernández improved to 6-0-1 (2 KO's).

According to a report by Shawn Roth of FightNews Canada, "Both fighters looked fresh and willing to brawl as the fight opened but the youth of Hernández quickly took over. Brown seemed unable to catch the much more agile Hernández with any real significant punches in the early going. Hernández used her elusiveness to duck out of Brown's punches and counter with a nice right hand that she used effectively through the match. Brown caught Hernández with a good left jab and right hook combo in the third, but Hernández seemed able to absorb the shots well and keep on moving. Hernandez continued to frustrate Brown in the middle rounds, pinning the older fighter on the ropes and teeing off on her. When Brown was able to muster an attack, Hernández was able to quickly move from trouble, but Brown did manage to catch the American with a left jab before she could maneuver away from Brown late in the seventh. The final rounds saw Brown come out looking sharper than the previous rounds as the two exchanged some hard blows while on the ropes. Brown connected a quality left jab on Hernández in the ninth, but once again, the younger Hernández responded with a hard right jab. In the end, Hernández proved too quick and conditioned for Brown to handle."

"I didn't know I was winning, I was just surviving with Lisa Brown," Hernández said following her win. "I just feel crazy right now."

Melissa told WBAN writer Bernie McCoy
"When I was still in the amateurs and thinking of turning professional, I had a list of four fighters that I held in a great deal of respect and esteem. Kelsey Jeffries was second on that list. Belinda Laracuente was at the top and she's now my manager. Chevelle Hallback and Melissa Del Valle were the other two." 
After being asked to describe her style as either "boxer," "puncher," or "brawler," Hernández replied, "All three, probably, depending on what's needed in a particular fight."

Professional boxing record

References

External links
 

1980 births
Living people
Puerto Rican women boxers
People from Mayagüez, Puerto Rico
Featherweight boxers